Cannabis Museum may refer to: 

 Cannabis Museum (Japan), a museum in Japan
 Dockside Cannabis Museum, a museum in the United States
 Montevideo Cannabis Museum, a museum in Uruguay
 Whakamana Cannabis Museum, a museum in New Zealand

See also
 Hemp Museum (disambiguation)